Harnack is the surname of a German family of intellectuals, artists, mathematicians, scientists, theologians and those in other fields. Several family members were executed by the Nazis during the last years of the Third Reich.

 Theodosius Harnack (1817–1889), German theologian
Anna Harnack (1849–?)
 Adolf von Harnack (1851–1930), German liberal theologian and historian of religion
Agnes von Zahn-Harnack (1884–1950), German writer and women's rights activist
 Ernst von Harnack (1888–1945), German anti-Nazi resistance fighter
 Gustav-Adolf von Harnack (1917-2010), German pediatrician
 Elisabet von Harnack (1892–1976), German social worker
 Axel von Harnack (1895–1974), German historian and philologist
 Carl Gustav Axel Harnack  (1851–1888), German mathematician
 Erich Harnack, professor of pharmacology
 Otto Harnack, literature historian
 Clara Harnack, painter and wife of Otto
 Arvid Harnack (1901–1942), German anti-Nazi resistance fighter
 Mildred Harnack (1902–1943), American anti-Nazi resistance fighter, wife of Arvid
 Falk Harnack (1913–1991), German anti-Nazi resistance fighter, film and stage director, brother of Arvid Harnack

Other uses
 Harnack's principle

Surnames